Ethan Ogrodniczuk (born 19 April 2001) is a Canadian track cyclist who currently rides for the Canadian National Team. He rode in the men's team pursuit event alongside Michael Foley, Jackson Kinniburgh & Derek Gee at the 2021 UCI Track Cycling World Championships in Roubaix, France, where the team placed 9th.

He attends the University of British Columbia.

Major results

Track 
2018
 National Junior Championships
1st  Scratch race
1st  Madison (with Riley Pickrell)
1st  Team sprint (with Riley Pickrell & Tyler Davies)
2nd  1km time trial
2019
 National Junior Championships
1st  Team pursuit (with Riley Pickrell, Jacob  Rubuliak & Sean Richardson)
2nd  Madison (with Riley Pickrell)
3rd  1km time trial
 National Championships
2nd  Madison (with John Wilcox)
2021
 UCI Track Cycling Nations Cup
2nd  Team pursuit, Cali (with Michael Foley, Jackson Kinniburgh, Sean Richardson & Mathias Guillemette)
 UCI Track Cycling World Championships
 9th Team Pursuit (with Michael Foley, Jackson Kinniburgh & Derek Gee)

References

External links

2001 births
Living people
Canadian track cyclists
Canadian male cyclists
21st-century Canadian people